ZoneCard is a travel card issued by the Strathclyde Partnership for Transport, formerly Strathclyde Passenger Transport in Scotland.

Usage
The scheme divides the SPT area into 9 regions distinguished by a letter
D for Dumbarton
S for Strathkelvin
G for Glasgow
Y for Inverclyde (In case there is confusion between the letter 'I' and the number '1')
R for Renfrew
K for Kilmarnock
A for Ayr
H for Hamilton
L for Lanark

These are further subdivided into zones dividing the main towns of the area for example Ayr, Prestwick and Troon are in A1, A2 and A3 respectively; there are 77 zones in total.  A traveller with a ticket for either G1 or G2 is also able to travel within the shaded city centre area, but travel into an outer Glasgow zone (G3 to G8) requiems a minimum of three zones. Tickets with three Glasgow zones are valid for travel in all Glasgow zones (G1 to G8). The city centre is served by both inner Glasgow zones, and purchasing one of these entitles the user to use the subway system in both areas.

A child's zonecard with 6 zones or an adult zonecard with 13 zones, entitles the user to travel throughout all zones.

A ZoneCard consists of a photocard and a paper counterpart which displays the validity period and is used for operating the barriers on Glasgow's Subway. Previously, passengers who have validated their tickets for the Subway needed to have their tickets manually checked at the ticket barriers at Glasgow Queen Street station because the barriers accept only standard-sized Subway tickets. In 2004, the Glasgow Queen Street barriers were updated so that ZoneCards did not need validation to operate them. The card can be purchased in durations of 1 week, 4 weeks, 10 weeks, and 1 year.

The ZoneCard can be used with any participating transport provider within the zones that the holder has purchased. With a total of approximately 70 transport providers—across bus, rail, and ferry services—in the scheme, there are very few companies who do not accept ZoneCards. The only TOC which doesn't accept ZoneCards is TransPennine Express.

Operators criticise the complexity of the zone system, which consists of 77 zones. By comparison, Transport for London's scheme consists of 9 zones despite containing 90 more underground stations than the SPT does rail stations. In addition, the SPT bus network is far larger due to the greater size of its zone system.

Revenue
The revenue from the scheme is split between the participating operators (the administration costs are absorbed by SPT) based on a number of factors, such as the number of routes operated by a provider, an annual user survey, and passenger counts by SPT officials. Some operators (notably Abellio ScotRail) are guaranteed a certain percentage of the revenue regardless of these factors but more recently Avanti West Coast, LNER and CrossCountry also receive revenue from ZoneCards as their trains provide services between Glasgow and Motherwell and vice versa. Aside from the previously mentioned administration costs, the scheme is designed to be self-supporting, unlike some other tickets which are subsidised with public money to help the significant percentage of households in the region that do not have access to a car.

References
 SPT News

External links
SPT's ZoneCard website
Map of the ZoneCard area

Transport in Scotland
Transport in Glasgow